Thorybes confusis, the confused cloudywing, is a butterfly  in the family Hesperiidae.

Appearance, behavior, and distribution
The confused cloudywing is often difficult to distinguish from southern and northern cloudywings, which it can often be found with.  It lives in open sites near woodlands.

References

Butterflies of North America
confusis
Butterflies described in 1923